Riverview, or Lightfoot House, is a historic home located at Port Royal, Caroline County, Virginia. It was built about 1845–1846, and is a two-story, five bay frame structure with a double-pile plan in the Greek Revival style.  It has a hipped roof and sits on a brick basement.  Also on the property is a contributing meathouse.

It was listed on the National Register of Historic Places in 1994.  It is located in the Port Royal Historic District

References

Houses on the National Register of Historic Places in Virginia
Greek Revival houses in Virginia
Houses completed in 1846
Houses in Caroline County, Virginia
National Register of Historic Places in Caroline County, Virginia
Individually listed contributing properties to historic districts on the National Register in Virginia